La Plaine is a village located on the eastern side of the island of Dominica. It has a population of 1,288, and (after Grand Bay) is the second-largest settlement in Saint Patrick Parish.

References

Populated places in Dominica
Saint Patrick Parish, Dominica